Pantelikha is a rural locality (a village) in Seletskoye Rural Settlement, Suzdalsky District, Vladimir Oblast, Russia. The population was 11 as of 2010.

Geography 
Pantelikha is located between Nerl and Irmes Rivers, 13 km north of Suzdal (the district's administrative centre) by road. Omutskoye is the nearest rural locality.

References 

Rural localities in Suzdalsky District